Muzahim Sa'ab Hassan al-Tikriti was the Air Defense Forces Commander of Iraq under the rule of Saddam Hussein from 1999 until 2003.

He was the Queen of Diamonds in the deck of most-wanted Iraqi playing cards and was taken into custody on 23 April 2003.

The Supreme Iraqi Criminal Tribunal issued a warrant against Hassan for crimes committed during the 1991 uprisings in Iraq.

Muzahim Sa'ab Hassan was released from custody in April 2012.

References

Living people
Military leaders of the Iraq War
Arab Socialist Ba'ath Party – Iraq Region politicians
Prisoners and detainees of the United States military
1949 births
Most-wanted Iraqi playing cards
Iraq War prisoners of war
Iraqi prisoners of war